Amara Salim Diané (born 19 August 1982) is an Ivorian former professional footballer who played as a forward.

Club career
Born in Abidjan, Diané started his career training at the famous youth academy at the famous Ivorian club ASEC Abidjan, before moving to the Parisian suburbs, where he joined the French side FC Mantes. Following his spell there, he moved to French fifth-tier club Roye in December 2000. In the 2002–03 season, he found his feet, scored 26 goals in 34 games, and earned a transfer to Ligue 2 club Stade de Reims. After another fine season, he was signed by Ligue 1 club RC Strasbourg. Another impressive season for the young striker followed, and after the eventual relegation of Strasbourg at the end of the season, he was linked with a number of clubs throughout Europe. Eventually, Paris Saint-Germain paid £2,300,000 for his services, signing him on a four-year deal. At the end of the 2007–08 Ligue 1 season PSG came close to being relegated, but on the final day of the season Diané scored twice in a 2–1 win over Sochaux to help secure their Ligue 1 status.

In May 2008, it was reported that English Premiership sides Newcastle United and Portsmouth were interested in signing the Ivorian, who was the season's top scorer at his club in the 2007–08 Ligue 1 season.

In July 2008, Diané was transferred from PSG to Qatari club Al-Rayyan Sports Club for a fee believed to be in the region of €8 million. He signed a contract worth €10 million over four years. Then, he signed a contract with Al Gharafa Sports Club. Diané cited mainly financial reasons for his decision to move to Qatar stating "From now I want to ensure my family's financial future. And only a Qatari club can permit me to do it."

On 26 October 2011, Diané switched team from Gharafa to UAE Pro-League side Al-Nasr SC for Ecuadorian striker Carlos Tenorio.

After a short spell in Belgium's second division Tubize, he retired.

International career
Diané was called up to the Ivory Coast national team for their friendly against Senegal on 18 August 2006. However, due to a groin injury, he missed out on playing, also missing the African Cup of Nations qualifier against Gabon, where the Elephants won 5–0, with Arouna Koné scoring a hat-trick. He was again called up to the national squad for the friendly against Sweden on 15 November 2006, along with fellow PSG player and former Ivory Coast captain Bonaventure Kalou. However, he was an unused substitute in the game.

In March 2007, he was one of four players to receive a late call-up for the Ivorians to participate in the African Cup of Nations qualifier against Madagascar in Antananarivo, due to injuries to other members of the squad. Amara made his presence felt in the tie against Madagascar with the third goal, and his first for the Elephants, in the team's 3–0 victory. Amara was named in the Elephants provisional squad for the 2008 African Cup of Nations in Ghana, but was left out of the final squad, with the Ivorian's wealth of attacking options limiting his chances.

International goals
Scores and results list Ivory Coast's goal tally first.

Honours
Paris Saint-Germain
Coupe de la Ligue: 2007–08

Al-Rayyan Sports Club
Emir of Qatar Cup: 2010

Al-Gharafa Sports Club
Qatar Crown Prince Cup: 2011

References

External links
 Profile on PSG Official Site (French)
 
 
 Amara Diané Interview

1982 births
Living people
Footballers from Abidjan
Association football forwards
Ivorian footballers
Ivory Coast international footballers
Ligue 1 players
Ligue 2 players
UAE Pro League players
Stade de Reims players
RC Strasbourg Alsace players
Paris Saint-Germain F.C. players
ASEC Mimosas players
Al-Rayyan SC players
Al Dhafra FC players
Qatar Stars League players
Al-Nasr SC (Dubai) players
Al-Gharafa SC players
Ivorian expatriate footballers
Ivorian expatriate sportspeople in France
Ivorian expatriate sportspeople in Qatar
Expatriate footballers in France
Expatriate footballers in Qatar
Expatriate footballers in the United Arab Emirates